The following squads and players competed in the World Women's Handball Championship in 2007 in France.

Angola 

 Maria Tavares
 Maria Eduardo
 Ilda Bengue
 Filomena Trindade
 Bombo Calandula
 Carolina Morais
 Nair Almeida
 Rosa Amaral
 Isabel Fernandes
 Marcelina Kiala
 Maria Pedro
 Luisa Kiala
 Natalia Bernardo
 Elizabeth Cailo
 Cristina Branco
 Cilizia Tavares

Coach: Jeronimo Neto

Argentina 

 Silvina Schlesinger
 Antonela Mena
 Cinthya Basile
 Georgina Constantino
 Bibiana Ferrea
 Magdalena Decilio
 Maria Romero
 Lucia Haro
 Maria Acosta
 Sonia Meyer
 Silvana Totolo
 Valentina Kogan
 Lucia Fernandez
 Valeria Bianchi
 Mariana Sanguinetti
 Marisol Carratu

Coach: Daniel Marcos Zeballos

Australia 

 Megan Miller
 Olivia Doherty
 Katia Boyd
 Lilly Maher
 Solveig Petersen
 Raelene Boulton
 Caitlin Wynne
 Catherine Kent
 Kimberly Tennant
 Rosalie Boyd
 Allira Hudson-Gofers
 Joanna Blondell
 Aminta Thomas
 Nicole Hughes
 Sally Potocki
 Mary Kelly

Coach: Katsuhiko Kinoshita

Austria 

 Natalia Rusnatchenko
 Tamara Bösch
 Marina Budecevic
 Alexandra Materzok
 Laura Magelinskas
 Lina Simkunaite
 Sabrina Thurner
 Natascha Schilk
 Beate Scheffknecht
 Petra Blazek
 Isabel Plach
 Katrin Engel
 Nina Stumvoll
 Simona Spiridon
 Katharina Reingruber

Coach: Herbert Müller

Brazil 

 Chana Masson
 Fabiana Diniz
 Alexandra Nascimento
 Fabiana Gripa
 Deonise Cavaleiro
 Daniela Piedade
 Mayara Moura
 Aline Waleska Rosas
 Viviane Jacques
 Juceli Aparecida Rosa
 Silvia Helena Pinheiro
 Darly Zoqby
 Idalina Mesquita
 Eduarda Amorim
 Aline Silva
 Francine Moraes

Coach: Juan Oliver

China 

 Liu Gui Ni
 Wei Qiu Xiang
 Liu Yun
 Liu Jin Lan
 Shen Ping
 Yang Liu
 Wang Min
 Wang Sha Sha
 Wang Ru
 Huang Hong
 Wu Ya Nan
 Liu Xiao Mei
 Wu Wen Juan
 Huang Dong Jie
 Shi Xiao Jun
 Yan Mei Zhu

Coach: Kang Jae Won

Croatia 

 Jelena Grubisic
 Miranda Tatari
 Dijana Golubic
 Vesna Milanovic-Litre
 Petra Starcek
 Anita Gace
 Nikica Pusic
 Bozica Palcic
 Ana Krizanac
 Lidija Horvat
 Svitlana Pasicnik
 Andrea Penezic
 Ivana Jelcic
 Ivana Lovric
 Maja Zebic
 Kristina Franic

Coach: Josip Sojat

Dominican Republic

 Ofelia Vazquez
 Crisleidy Hernandez
 Nargelin Amparo
 Ingrid Santos
 Judith Granado
 Yndiana Mateo
 Nancy Pena
 Mariela Andino
 Miledys Garcia
 Suleydy Suarez
 Yacaira Tejeda
 Elisabeth Mejia
 Rosa Mambru
 Rudth de Leon
 Luisa Pierre
 Mariela Cespedes

Coach: Felix Romero

France 

 Amandine Leynaud
 Stéphanie Lambert
 Nina Kamto Njitam
 Camille Ayglon
 Allison Pineau
 Veronique Pecqueux-Rolland
 Sophie Herbrecht
 Stéphanie Cano
 Isabelle Wendling
 Myriam Borg
 Valérie Nicolas
 Siraba Dembele
 Delphine Guehl
 Christine Vanparys-Torres
 Raphaelle Tervel
 Maakan Tounkara
 Katty Piejos
 Mariama Signate

Coach: Olivier Krumbholz

Germany 

 Sabine Englert
 Nadine Härdter
 Ulrike Stange
 Grit Jurack
 Ania Rösler
 Nina Wörz
 Anne Müller
 Nora Reiche
 Anna Loerper
 Mandy Hering
 Nadine Krause
 Kathrin Blacha
 Susann Müller
 Clara Woltering
 Maike Brückmann
 Maren Baumbach
 Stefanie Melbeck

Coach: Armin Emrich

Hungary 

 Orsolya Herr
 Katalin Pálinger
 Mónika Kovacsicz
 Beatrix Balogh
 Ibolya Mehlmann
 Ágnes Hornyák
 Rita Borbás
 Piroska Szamoránsky
 Anita Görbicz
 Bernadett Ferling
 Zita Szucsánszki
 Zsuzsanna Tomori
 Tímea Tóth
 Gabriella Szűcs
 Orsolya Vérten
 Erika Kirsner

Coach: András Németh

Japan 

 Sachiko Katsuda
 Yuko Arihama
 Mariko Komatsu
 Mineko Hirai
 Kaori Onozawa
 Akiko Kinjo
 Hitomi Sakugawa
 Tomoko Sakamoto
 Shio Fujii
 Aiko Hayafune
 Kimiko Hida
 Keiko Mizuno
 Noriko Omae
 Hisayo Taniguchi
 Kazusa Nagano
 Akie Uegaki

Coach: Bert Bouwer

Kazakhstan 

 Ruta Pozhemite
 Tatyana Chumakova
 Irina Borechko
 Marina Pikalova
 Lyazzat Kilibayeva
 Yelena Kozlova
 Anastassiya Batuyeva
 Yelena Portova
 Olga Yegunova
 Yekaterina Mishurina
 Natalya Kulakova
 Gulzira Iskakova
 Zhannat Aitenova
 Natalya Kubrina
 Natalya Yakovleva
 Yana Vassilyeva

Coach: Lev Yaniev

Macedonia 

 Olga Kolesnik
 Robertina Mecevska
 Natasa Kocevska
 Anzela Platon
 Alegra Oholanga Loki
 Elena Gjorgjievska
 Daniela Noveska
 Valentina Radulovic
 Natasa Mladenovska
 Natalja Todorovska
 Julija Portjanko
 Biljana Crvenkoska
 Tanja Andrejeva
 Dragana Pecevska
 Marina Lambevska
 Mirjeta Bajramoska

Coach: Ljubomir Savevski

Norway 

 Kari Aalvik Grimsbö
 Anette Hovind Johansen
 Katja Nyberg
 Ragnhild Aamodt
 Göril Snorroeggen
 Else-Marthe Sörlie Lybekk
 Tonje Nöstvold
 Karoline Dyhre Breivang
 Gro Hammerseng
 Kari Mette Johansen
 Terese Pedersen
 Marit Malm Frafjord
 Katrine Lunde Haraldsen
 Linn Jörum Sulland
 Linn Kristin Riegelhuth
 Vigdis Harsaker

Coach: Marit Breivik

Paraguay

Poland 

 Aleksandra Jacek
 Dorota Malczewska
 Kaja Zaleczna
 Ewa Damiecka
 Dagmara Kowalska
 Malgorzata Majerek
 Kinga Polenz
 Iwona Lacz
 Agnieszka Wolska
 Karolina Kudlacz
 Izabela Duda
 Magdalena Chemicz
 Katarzyna Duran
 Kinga Byzdra
 Malgorzata Sadowska
 Klaudia Pielesz

Coach: Zenon Lakomy

Republic of the Congo 

 Virginia Yende
 Jumelle Okoko
 Nelle Bouangoli
 Jocelyne Mavoungou Tsahout
 Didiane Oumba
 Prisca Ngoli Madzou
 Leontine Kibamba Nkembo
 Gisele Donguet
 Monona Bassarila Ndona
 Clarisse Leroy Opondzo
 Chantal Okoye Mbon
 Amelie Okombi Mouakale
 Aurelle Itoua Atsono
 Aubine Menet Ngamabana
 Carmelia Assiana
 Fleurine Ngayoulou Ngampika

Coach: Gheorghe Ionescu

Romania 

 Tereza Paslaru
 Ramona Maier
 Roxana Gatzel
 Florina Barsan
 Raluca Ivan
 Camelia Balint
 Adriana Olteanu
 Cristina Neagu
 Aurelia Bradeanu
 Ionela Stanca
 Clara Vadineanu
 Talida Tolnai
 Steluta Luca
 Luminita Dinu
 Adina Meirosu
 Valeria Bese
 Narcissa Lecusanu

Coach: Gheorghe Tadici

Russia 

 Inna Suslina
 Polina Vyakhireva
 Irina Poltoratskaya
 Oxana Romenskaya
 Liudmila Postnova
 Anna Kareeva
 Ekaterina Andryushina
 Yana Uskova
 Elena Polenova
 Emilyia Turey
 Natalia Shipilova
 Maria Sidorova
 Olga Levina
 Nadezhda Muravyeva
 Elena Dmitrieva
 Irina Bliznova

Coach: Evgeny Trefilov

Spain

 Tatiana Garmendia Lopez
 Patricia Pinedo Saenz
 Beatriz Fernandez Ibanez
 Maria Berenguel Verdegay
 Carmen Martin Berenguer
 Elisabeth Pinedo Saenz
 Marta Mangue Gonzalez
 Macarena Aguilar Diaz
 Aitziber Elejaga Vargas
 Goretti Castaneda Mora
 Patricia Alonso Jimenez
 Isabell Ortuno Torrico
 Maria Sanchez Bravo
 Begona Fernandez Molinos
 Andrea Arias Dasilva
 Noelia Oncina Moreno

Coach: Jorge Duenas de Galarza

Tunisia 

 Noura Ben Slama
 Sonia Ghribi
 Manel Kouki
 Rym Mannai
 Amira Fekih Romdhane
 Sinda Fadhloun
 Ines Khouildi
 Hela Msaad
 Raja Toumi
 Ines Jaouadi
 Abir Riyahi
 Nadia Zekri
 Rahma Tered
 Ouided Kilani
 Haifa Abdelhak
 Mouna Chebbah

Coach: Bogosav Peric

South Korea 

 Oh Young Ran
 Woo Sun Hee
 Kim On A
 Huh Soon Young
 Yoo Hyun Ji
 An Jung Hwa
 Kim Mam Sun
 Kim Cha Youn
 Oh Seong Ok
 Yong Se Ra
 Park Chung Hee
 Lee Sang Eun
 Lee Min Hee
 Myoung Bok Hee
 Choi Im Jeong
 Moon Pil Hee

Coach: Lim Young Chul

Ukraine 

 Oksana Sakada
 Mariya Boklashchuk
 Olena Iatsenko
 Viktoriya Borshchenko
 Olena Radchenko
 Olena Tsyhytsia
 Iryna Shybanova
 Olena Reznir
 Viktoriya Tymoshenkova
 Yuliya Manaharova
 Natalya Lyapina
 Tetiana Vorozhtsova
 Yuliya Snopova
 Viktoria Tsybulenko
 Maria Makarenko
 Iryna Sheyenko

Coach: Leonid Ratner

References 

World Women's Handball Championship squads
World Handball Championship squads